Yosemite Sam is an American animated cartoon character in the Looney Tunes and Merrie Melodies series of cartoons produced by Warner Bros. Animation. The character appeared in dozens of cartoons from the 1940s to the 2000s.

Golden Age Саrtoоnѕ

1945 
 Hare Trigger (debut)

1947 
 Along Came Daffy (pitting Yosemite Sam and his brother against Daffy Duck; one of only two Sam cartoons not to feature Bugs Bunny)

1948 
 Buccaneer Bunny
 Bugs Bunny Rides Again

1949 
 High Diving Hare

1950 
 Mutiny on the Bunny
 Big House Bunny
 Bunker Hill Bunny

1951 
 Rabbit Every Monday
 The Fair-Haired Hare
 Ballot Box Bunny

1952 
 14 Carrot Rabbit
 Hare Lift

1953 
 Southern Fried Rabbit
 Hare Trimmed

1954 
 Captain Hareblower

1955 
 Sahara Hare
 This Is a Life?
 Roman Legion-Hare

1956 
 Rabbitson Crusoe
 A Star Is Bored

1957 
 Piker's Peak

1958 
 Knighty Knight Bugs

1959 
 Wild and Woolly Hare
 Hare-Abian Nights (Directed by Ken Harris of the Chuck Jones unit; only one from the "classic" era that is not directed by Friz Freleng or a member of the Friz Freleng unit)

1960 
 From Hare to Heir
 Lighter Than Hare
 Horse Hare

1961 
 Prince Violent

1962 
 Honey's Money (the second of Sam's only two cartoons not to feature Bugs Bunny)
 Shishkabugs (Friz Freleng's last completely original cartoon with Yosemite Sam in the original Looney Tunes era)

1963 
 Devil's Feud Cake (Friz Freleng's last overall appearance of Yosemite Sam in the original Looney Tunes era)

1964 
 Dumb Patrol (Sam's last cartoon in the original Looney Tunes era, and the only one directed by a member of the unit of Friz Freleng other than Freleng himself)
 Pancho's Hideaway (features a Mexican relative, Pancho Vanilla, who is designed much like his cousin Sam but has a different accent)

After the Golden Age

1979 
 Bugs Bunny's Christmas Carol (Friz Freleng's last Yosemite Sam cartoon overall)

1980
 The Bugs Bunny Mystery Special

1981 
 The Looney Looney Looney Bugs Bunny Movie (movie)

1982 
 Bugs Bunny's 3rd Movie: 1001 Rabbit Tales (movie)

1983 
 Daffy Duck's Fantastic Island (movie)

1988 
 Who Framed Roger Rabbit (movie)

1990 
 Tiny Toon Adventures (TV series)

1991 
 (Blooper) Bunny

1992 
 Invasion of the Bunny Snatchers

1994 
 The Warners 65th Anniversary Special (Animaniacs guest appearance)

1995 
 Carrotblanca

1996 
 Space Jam (movie)

1997 
 From Hare to Eternity

2000 
 Tweety's High-Flying Adventure (movie)

2003 
 Looney Tunes: Back in Action (movie)

2004 
 Hare and Loathing in Las Vegas

2006 
 Bah, Humduck! A Looney Tunes Christmas (movie)

2011 
 The Looney Tunes Show (TV series)

2015 
 Looney Tunes: Rabbits Run (movie)
 New Looney Tunes (TV series)

2020 
 Looney Tunes Cartoons (HBO Max)

2021 
 Space Jam: A New Legacy (movie)

References

Yosemite Sam